Sakhi kandhei (Also sakhi kundhei, sakhi nata) is a string puppetry show popular in the Indian state of Odisha,
especially in the Kendrapara district of Odisha. This form of art is still performed by local artists in and around Palakana, a small village in Kendrapara. Puppeteers generally form groups and travel from village to village for performing shows. Wooden dolls are tied to strings which are controlled by pulling and releasing the strings. Different expression by pulling the strings narrate tales from the Puranas
and modern social life.  A group of artists perform music and give background voice for the narration of stories.

Considering sakhi kandhei a dying art form, Odisha Sangeet Natak Akademi is taking steps to popularize and revive it. A handful of puppeteers have taken initiatives to revive this art form.

Puppets
Wooden puppets are used in Sakhi kandhei which have three pieces; head and the two hands with the wrists with hole in them to insert fingers. The three pieces are joined together and long sleeved dresses are used to cover the bodies. Strings are attached to the thumb, limbs and other body parts which are pulled and released to give rhythmic gesture based on the story's narratives.

References

See also
 Kathputli (Puppet)
 Puppetry

Odia culture
Puppetry in India